The Red Hook graving dock, initially known as "Graving Dock One",  was a  graving dock located at the Vigor Shipyards in Red Hook, Brooklyn in New York City. In its time, the dock was considered to have contributed to making Red Hook the "center of the shipping industry in New York" and was part of the city's largest dry dock and shipping dock.

Construction on the dock was completed in 1866 and the unit was utilized as a repair dock for large vessels until its closure in 2005, when the lease held by Stevens Technical Services expired. Prior to its closure, ownership of the dock had been transferred from the initial owners, the Todd Shipyards, to Vigor after the merger of several shipyard companies.

Shortly around the time of the lease's expiration, IKEA expressed their intent to purchase the property and turn it into a parking lot. Conservationists argued against the purchase, stating that the dock had been created at the end of the American Civil War and would be considered eligible for inclusion in the National Register of Historic Places. In 2006 a comptroller for the city also noted that paving over the dock would be "premature". Efforts to salvage the property included protests and a lawsuit against the United States Army. These efforts were unsuccessful and the graving dock was filled in to create a parking lot. The move was met with more criticism after 2008 reports stated that New York was in need of seven graving docks similar to the Red Hook graving dock.

References

Transportation buildings and structures in Brooklyn
Red Hook, Brooklyn